Fiorina la vacca (Fiorina the Cow) is a 1972 commedia sexy all'italiana directed by Vittorio De Sisti. The film, loosely based on several works by Ruzante, is an example of the Decamerotici genre popular in the early 1970s.

Plot
Set in the 16th century, the film tells the story of a cow named Fiorina, sold by a farmer to seek his fortune as a mercenary. From here the cow will changing hands, sometimes legitimately, sometimes not. Finally the cow is sold to a rich man who also wants to buy the vendor woman, who is also called Fiorina.

Cast
 Janet Ågren: Tazia
 Gastone Moschin: Ruzante
 Renzo Montagnani:  Menico
 Ornella Muti: Teresa
 Jenny Tamburi: Zanetta
 Ewa Aulin: Giacomina
 Felice Andreasi:  Michelon
 Rodolfo Baldini: lover of Teresa
 Mario Carotenuto: padron Beolco
 Angela Covello: Fiorina
 Graziella Galvani: Betta
 Piero Vida: Nane
 Renzo Marignano: Massaro di Beolco

References

External links
 

1972 films
Commedia sexy all'italiana
Films scored by Ennio Morricone
Films set in the 16th century
Films directed by Vittorio De Sisti
1970s sex comedy films
1972 comedy films
1970s Italian films